Dairon is a given name. Notable people with the given name include:

Dairon Asprilla (born 1992), Colombian footballer
Dairon Blanco (1992–2020), Cuban footballer
Dairon Mosquera (born 1992), Colombian footballer
Dairon Pérez (born 1994), Cuban footballer
Dairon Reyes (born 2003), Cuban footballer

See also
Dayron, another given name